The intercept theorem, also known as Thales's theorem, basic proportionality theorem or side splitter theorem is an important theorem in elementary geometry about the ratios of various line segments that are created if two intersecting lines are intercepted by a pair of parallels. It is equivalent to the theorem about ratios in similar triangles. It is traditionally attributed to Greek mathematician Thales. It was known to the ancient Babylonians and Egyptians, although its first known proof appears in Euclid's Elements.

Formulation
Suppose S is the intersection point of two lines and A, B are the intersections of the first line with the two parallels, such that B is further away from S than A, and similarly C, D are the intersections of the second line with the two parallels such that D is further away from S than C.

 The ratio of the two segments on the same line starting at S equals the ratio of the segments on the parallels: 
The converse of the first statement is true as well, i.e. if the two intersecting lines are intercepted by two arbitrary lines and  holds then the two intercepting lines are parallel. However, the converse of the second statement is not true.
 If you have more than two lines intersecting in S, then ratio of the two segments on a parallel equals the ratio of the according segments on the other parallel:  , 

An example for the case of three lines is given in the second graphic below.

The first intercept theorem shows the ratios of the sections from the lines, the second the ratios of the sections from the lines as well as the sections from the parallels, finally the third shows the ratios of the sections from the parallels.

Related concepts

Similarity and similar triangles

The intercept theorem is closely related to similarity. It is equivalent to the concept of similar triangles, i.e. it can be used to prove the properties of similar triangles and similar triangles can be used to prove the intercept theorem. By matching identical angles you can always place two similar triangles in one another so that you get the configuration in which the intercept theorem applies; and conversely the intercept theorem configuration always contains two similar triangles.

Scalar multiplication in vector spaces
In a normed vector space, the axioms concerning the scalar multiplication (in particular  and ) ensure that the intercept theorem holds. One has

Applications

Algebraic formulation of compass and ruler constructions
There are three famous problems in elementary geometry which were posed by the Greeks in terms of compass and straightedge constructions:
 Trisecting the angle
 Doubling the cube
 Squaring the circle

It took more than 2000 years until all three of them were finally shown to be impossible with the given tools in the 19th century, using algebraic methods that had become available during that period of time.
In order to reformulate them in algebraic terms using field extensions, one needs to match field operations with compass and straightedge constructions (see constructible number). In particular it is important to assure that for two given line segments, a new line segment can be constructed such that its length equals the product of lengths of the other two. Similarly one needs to be able to construct, for a line segment of length , a new line segment of length . The intercept theorem can be used to show that in both cases such a construction is possible.

Dividing a line segment in a given ratio

Measuring and survey

Height of the Cheops pyramid

According to some historical sources the Greek mathematician Thales applied the intercept theorem to determine the height of the Cheops' pyramid. The following description illustrates the use of the intercept theorem to compute the height of the pyramid. It does not, however, recount Thales' original work, which was lost.

Thales measured the length of the pyramid's base and the height of his pole. Then at the same time of the day he measured the length of the pyramid's shadow and the length of the pole's shadow. This yielded the following data:
 height of the pole (A): 1.63 m
 shadow of the pole (B): 2 m
 length of the pyramid base: 230 m
 shadow of the pyramid: 65 m
From this he computed

Knowing A,B and C he was now able to apply the intercept theorem to compute

Measuring the width of a river

Parallel lines in triangles and trapezoids
The intercept theorem can be used to prove that a certain construction yields parallel line (segment)s.

Proof
An elementary proof of the theorem uses triangles of equal area to derive the basic statements about the ratios (claim 1). The other claims then follow by applying the first claim and contradiction.

Claim 1

Claim 2

Claim 3

Claim 4 
Claim 4 can be shown by applying the intercept theorem for two lines.

Notes

References 

 
 
 

External links 

 Intercept Theorem at PlanetMath
Alexander Bogomolny: Thales' Theorems and in particular Thales' Theorem at Cut-the-Knot
intercept theorem interactive

Euclidean geometry
Theorems in plane geometry